James Hegney (born 1978) is a male retired boxer who competed for England.

Boxing career
Hegney was an English National Champion in 1998 after winning the prestigious ABA flyweight title, boxing out of the Castle Vale ABC.

He represented England in the flyweight (-51Kg) division, at the 1998 Commonwealth Games in Kuala Lumpur, Malaysia.

References

1978 births
English male boxers
Boxers at the 1998 Commonwealth Games
Living people
Flyweight boxers
Commonwealth Games competitors for England